James Edward John Altham (born 1944), known as Jimmy Altham and normally cited as J. E. J. Altham, is a British philosopher and a Fellow of Gonville and Caius College, Cambridge.

Biography

He obtained his BA degree in Philosophy at Cambridge followed in 1969 by a Ph.D. also in Philosophy. His dissertation was entitled 'Assertion, Command and Obligation. Philosophical Foundations of the Logic of Imperatives and Deontic Logic'.

Altham was then appointed a lecturer in the Faculty of Philosophy at Cambridge from 1972. He was a former Sidgwick lecturer in Philosophy and retired as professor in 1999. He is now an emeritus professor and Fellow at Gonville and Cauis. He has published on a wide range of philosophical areas including logic, ethics and political philosophy.

Selected publications
 The Logic of Plurality. London: Methuen, 1971.
  'Rawls's Difference Principle'. Philosophy 48 (1973):75–78.
 'Ethics of Risk'. Proceedings of the Aristotelian Society, 84 (1983), 15–29. Retrieved from https://www.jstor.org/stable/4545003
 'Wicked promises' in I. Hacking (ed.), Exercises in Analysis. Cambridge University Press, 1985, pp. 1–21.

References

1944 births
Living people
20th-century British philosophers
21st-century British philosophers
Fellows of Gonville and Caius College, Cambridge